Yvonne Keuls (Batavia (Jakarta), December 17, 1931) is a Dutch Indo writer. She writes novels about social problems, as well as about herself and her family. Her writing style is realistic and sometimes humorous. Her work has received several awards. Early the early 1970s, Keuls became a permanent panellist in the NCRV quiz show, Like father, like son, and the variation, Like mother, like daughter,  Like mother, like son, and Like father, like daughter. In the 1980s, she took part in the NCRV's panel program. Keuls is married with children.  Her filmography includes Jan Rap en Z'n Maat.

Publications

Translated into English 
 Yvonne Keuls: The mother of David S.. Transl. by J.W. Arriens. London, Souvenir Press, 1985.  Same transl., other ed.: London, Corgi, 1986 & New York, St. Martin's Press, 1986

Works
 Onbegonnen werk (1967)
 Jan Rap en z'n maat (1977)
 Keuls potje (1979)
 Een doekje voor het bloeden (1980)
 Keulsiefjes (1980)
 De moeder van David S., geboren 3 juli 1959 (1980)
 Kleine muizen (1981)
 Regenwormen (1981)
 Het verrotte leven van Floortje Bloem (1982)
 Annie Berber en het verdriet van een tedere crimineel (1985)
 De arrogantie van de macht (1986)
 Daniël Maandag (1988)
 De tocht van het kind (1990)
 Meneer en mevrouw zijn gek (1992)
 Lowietjes smartengeld of: Het gebit van mijn moeder (1995)
 Keulsiefjes (1996)
 Mevrouw mijn moeder (1999)
 Dochters (1999)
 Indische Tantes (2001)
 Madame K: Van Indisch kind tot Haagse dame (2001)
 Familiegedoe (2004)
 Benjamins bruid (2008)
 Allemaal beestjes (2009)

References

External links

 Official website (Dutch language)

1931 births
Living people
Indo people
Dutch people of Indonesian descent
20th-century Dutch novelists
21st-century Dutch novelists
People from Jakarta
21st-century Dutch women writers
20th-century Dutch women writers
Dutch women novelists